The 2007 Eastern Michigan Eagles football team represented Eastern Michigan University during the 2007 NCAA Division I FBS football season.  Eastern Michigan competed as a member of the Mid-American Conference (MAC) West Division.  The team was coached by Jeff Genyk and played their homes game in Rynearson Stadium.  The Eagles finished the season 4–8, tied with the 2004 and 2005 seasons for the most wins in Genyk's career.

Recruiting

Schedule

Roster

Coaching staff

Game summaries

Pittsburgh

Ball State

Northern Illinois

After falling behind 13–0, the Eagles came back, and won 21–19 by blocking a Northern Illinois field goal attempt at the end of the game.

Howard

Vanderbilt

Michigan

The Eagles registered their best showing ever against the Michigan Wolverines. In this 33–22 loss, EMU largely stifled Michigan's all-time leading quarterback, Chad Henne, and returned a blocked kick for a touchdown.

Ohio

Northwestern

Western Michigan

This game was the first of three games that would determine the 2007 Michigan MAC Trophy winner (Central Michigan vs. WMU November 17 and CMU vs. EMU November 17). Prior to this game, Western led the all-time series 26-14-2 and had not lost in Rynearson Stadium since 1991 (7 wins).

Only a first quarter safety kept the Eagles from registering their first shutout since 1997.

Recap | Boxscore | WMU pregame notes

Toledo

Bowling Green

Central Michigan

This was the final game in determining the 2007 Michigan MAC Trophy winner. With their win in this game, the Eagles captured the trophy for the first time.

References

Eastern Michigan
Eastern Michigan Eagles football seasons
Eastern Michigan Eagles football